Pacific View Mall (formerly known as Buenaventura Center and Buenaventura Plaza) is a regional, enclosed mall located on the West Coast in Ventura, California. It covers a leasable area of almost .

Its current anchors include Macy's, JCPenney, and Target.

History
The open-air Buenaventura Center was built between 1962 and 1965, with its first store, The Broadway, opening in September 1963. Inline stores, such as Barker Brothers Furniture, Kimo's Polynesian Shop, F.W. Woolworth and a Vons-Shopping Bag Supermarket, opened during 1964. J.C. Penney began business in November 1965.

A Teflon-coated, fiberglass enclosure was installed in 1983. During the 1990s, after 30 years in operation, the mall began to show its age as tenants began to move out, and the vacancy rate rose.  MCA Buenaventura Associates LP, the owners at the time, tried to revitalize the mall by expanding the available retail space and acquiring new anchor department stores.

In 1995, plans were announced to lure two major anchors: Robinsons-May and Sears, from the neighbouring Esplanade Mall in Oxnard.  A year of tense political battles followed between Oxnard and Ventura and multiple lawsuits were filed. The pending litigation, along with debate regarding the mall's sales tax agreements, stalled the expansion negotiations with the major retailers. In 1996, The Broadway was converted to Macy's.

JCPenney moved to a smaller store in the mall in 1999, and Robinsons-May took over its old space. Sears opened a new store in that same year.

At the end of 1996, Macerich purchased Buenaventura Mall, as part of a deal that included two other shopping centers in the area for $125 million.  Macerich, along with the old owners, continued to try to complete the project, and the proposals would drudge through the legal system for a few more years.  In 2001, Macerich finally completed the expansion project, with a $89 million renovation that included the two new anchor department stores.  The mall was renamed to Pacific View Mall during this time.

In 2006, the Robinsons-May store at the mall closed down after Federated Stores purchased The May Department Stores Company.  Other tenants 
around it at the north end of the mall had also left, leaving that part of the mall empty with many vacant spaces.  It remained that way for over a year until 2007, when it was announced a new 2-story Target store would occupy the anchor space.

In order to fill the empty building space at the north extension - located separately outside of the mall, a new Trader Joe's grocery store opened, accompanied by Staples, BevMo! and a Massage Envy spa.    Later the old Barker Brothers furniture store was converted into 24 Hour Fitness.

In 2015, Sears Holdings spun off 235 of its properties, including the Sears at Pacific View Mall, into Serigate Growth Properties.

Larger tenants in the mall include Hollister Co., Victoria's Secret, H&M, Sephora, Old Navy, Macy's and American Eagle Outfitters.

On November 7, 2019, it was announced that Sears would be closing this location a part of a plan to close 96 stores nationwide. The store closed on February 2, 2020.

On November 14, 2019, it was announced that Forever 21 would be closing as part of a plan to close 111 stores nationwide. The store closed in January 2020.

References

External links
 Pacific View Mall Official site

Macerich
Shopping malls established in 1964
Shopping malls in Ventura County, California
Buildings and structures in Ventura, California
1964 establishments in California